Bald Hills may refer to:

Australia
Bald Hills, Queensland, a suburb in Brisbane
Bald Hills, Victoria, a locality in the Shire of Hepburn

Canada
Bald Hills range in Jasper National Park

US
Bald Hill Range in Middlesex County, Connecticut
Bald Hills, California, former community in Humboldt County, California
Bald Hills (Humboldt County), a mountain range in Humboldt County, California
Bald Hills (Lassen County), California

Fictional places
Bald Hills (Lisiye Gory), the Bolkonsky estate in the novel War and Peace

See also
Bald Hill (disambiguation)